A Run for Your Money is a 1949 Ealing Studios comedy film starring Donald Houston and Meredith Edwards as two Welshmen visiting London for the first time. The supporting cast includes Alec Guinness, Moira Lister and Hugh Griffith.

Plot
Two Welsh coal miners from (fictional) Hafoduwchbenceubwllymarchogcoch, David 'Dai Number 9' Jones (Donald Houston) and Thomas 'Twm' Jones (Meredith Edwards), win a contest run by the Echo newspaper. The prize is £100 each, plus the best seats for an important rugby union match between England and Wales  at Twickenham. For the naive Welshmen, this is their first trip to England.

They are supposed to be met at Paddington station by Whimple (Alec Guinness), a gardening columnist on the paper, but nobody told them. Then the two miners become separated when Dai is picked up by attractive con artist Jo (Moira Lister) after she overhears them talking about the prize money. At Jo's suggestion, she and Dai go to the newspaper to collect the money. The editor makes Whimple responsible for showing Dai around, but Jo soon manages to lose him. Whimple hears about Jo's criminal methods from a fellow reporter and runs out in search of them. As they spend time together, Dai begins to fall in love with Jo, though he already has a girlfriend back in Wales: Bronwen, the boss's secretary.

Meanwhile, Twm recognizes a familiar face: Huw Price (Hugh Griffith), a down-on-his-luck harpist and traditional Chief Singer with whom he had once won the grand prize at an important Welsh music festival. They go looking for Dai (between drinks at various pubs). By the time they arrive at the Echo to collect Twm's share of the prize, they're sopping drunk. Not knowing who Twm is, the editor has the pair kicked out. Eventually, Twm and Huw give up and go to the rugby match, getting there just as it ends (Wales wins). There, they meet up with Whimple.

Jo takes Dai shopping for a diamond ring for Bronwen; her confederate Barney (Leslie Perrins) tries to cheat him, but Dai changes his mind about which ring he wants and ends up getting a fair deal. Jo takes him back to her flat so Barney can sneak in and steal Dai's money. Dai proposes that she move to Wales and offers to give her money to pay for the fare, but then he remembers Bronwen and changes his mind. Disappointed more than she expected, she steals his money. Just then, Whimple shows up and tells Dai the truth about the woman, but she runs off.

A chase ensues. Dai gets Jo's purse, with the money in it, and runs to catch the train back to Wales, where he is reunited with Twm and Huw. Jo and Barney bring a policeman and accuse Dai of being a thief; to avoid trouble, Dai gives back the purse. As the train pulls out though, Jo throws him back his money, much to Barney's disgust.

Cast

Donald Houston as David 'Dai Number 9' Jones
Meredith Edwards as Thomas 'Twm' Jones
Moira Lister as Jo
Alec Guinness as Whimple
Hugh Griffith as Huw
Clive Morton as Editor of the Echo
Julie Milton as Bronwen
Peter Edwards as Davies
Joyce Grenfell as Mrs. Pargiter
Leslie Perrins as Barney

Production
All the music in this film is based on traditional Welsh songs.

Much of it was filmed on location in London. Nant-y-Moel was used for scenes of the Welsh village's railway station. There are a number of joking references to the deprivations and regulations of postwar England.

Hafoduwchbenceubwllymarchogcoch:  translates roughly as 'Shed over the cess-pit of the red knight'.

Reception
According to The Independent, most Welsh filmgoers didn't like it, believing it played to stereotypes. However, it was generally very popular with British audiences and was nominated for a BAFTA award (for Best British Film) in 1950.

References

External links 

1949 films
1949 comedy films
British comedy films
British black-and-white films
Films set in England
Films set in London
Films set in Wales
Ealing Studios films
Films directed by Charles Frend
Films produced by Michael Balcon
1940s English-language films
1940s British films